American James McGee (born December 13, 1972) is an American video game designer. He is best known as the designer of American McGee's Alice, its sequel Alice: Madness Returns, and his works on various video games from id Software.

Early life
American James McGee was born on December 13, 1972, in Dallas, Texas to an eccentric mother who was a house painter. His only interaction with his biological father was on his 13th birthday, a meeting which turned violent as McGee's father drunkenly assaulted him that night. McGee was highly creative and was gifted in mathematics and science, taking an early interest in computer programming. He was eventually accepted to a magnet school for computer science.

In explaining where his name came from, McGee has said that his mother was a hippie and was inspired by a woman she knew in college that named her child "America":

McGee had a number of stepfathers when growing up until his mother finally settled into a relationship with a transgender woman. When McGee was sixteen, he came home from school and found his house empty and abandoned; the only things left were his bed, his books, his clothes and his Commodore 64 computer. His mother had sold the house to pay for two plane tickets and the fee for her girlfriend's gender confirmation surgery, leaving him on his own. He packed up his computer, dropped out of high school and took a variety of odd jobs, finally settling on a Volkswagen repair shop.

Career

id Software
At 21, McGee, an automobile and gaming enthusiast, moved to an apartment complex where he met and befriended John Carmack. Carmack offered McGee a tech support job at id Software, where he was quickly promoted to level designer and music manager. McGee, along with Kevin Cloud and Tim Willits, were part of id Software's "second generation" of developers, working on games such as The Ultimate Doom, Doom II, Quake and Quake II.

In 1998, McGee was fired from id Software. Later, McGee would say that the day he got fired was very meaningful to him:

According to former id staff Sandy Petersen, Tim Willits was the one responsible for McGee's firing (although he did not mention Willits by name; referring to him only by "Snake" and "X"). Allegedly, during the development of Quake II, Willits deliberately gave bad level design advice to McGee and when he presented his work to Carmack, it angered him and McGee was fired soon after. McGee has stated to this day, he still has no idea why he was fired but acknowledged the fact that it was due to "internal politics and my own failings".

Electronic Arts
McGee soon joined Electronic Arts and worked as creative director on American McGee's Alice (with Rogue Entertainment), which garnered favorable reviews. Discussions began soon after the game's release about making a film adaptation of the game; initially Wes Craven was attached to direct the film, and later actress Sarah Michelle Gellar bought the film rights, but the film has remained languishing in development hell.

After finishing Alice, McGee left EA "in frustration" when the company fired his creative partner R. J. Berg and shut down Rogue Entertainment. In 2002, McGee founded the short-lived Carbon6, which two years later became known as Mauretania Import Export Company.

The Mauretania Import Export Company
McGee directed the 2002 music video for the song "Same Ol' Road" by the band dredg, from their album El Cielo. Partnering with Enlight Software and its founder Trevor Chan, McGee released the games Scrapland in 2004 and Bad Day L.A. in 2006.

Spicy Horse

The planned American McGee's Oz, which was to be produced in conjunction with Ronin Games, was canceled over financial difficulties at Atari. American McGee's Grimm, developed by his Shanghai-based game development studio Spicy Horse for the online service GameTap, was released in 23 weekly episodic segments, starting in 2007.

At the 2009 D.I.C.E. Summit, Electronic Arts CEO John Riccitiello announced that a sequel to American McGee's Alice was in development for PC, PlayStation 3 and Xbox 360 by McGee's Spicy Horse studio. In July 2010, at the EA Showcase in San Francisco, Spicy Horse and EA announced that sequel's title, Alice: Madness Returns, released less than one year after its announcement, on June 14, 2011.

More recently, McGee's Spicy Horse expanded to include another brand, Spicy Pony, to produce digital mobile media games for the iPhone platform. Their first title, DexIQ, was released in early December 2009, and its follow-up, Crooked House, was released in March 2010 (both had iPad versions released in June 2010). On December 17, 2010, McGee's old company The Mauretania Import Export Company was dissolved and all intellectual property was transferred to Spicy Horse.

In 2012, McGee was focusing on free-to-play games for mobile devices with BigHead Bash, Akaneiro, and Crazy Fairies. In 2013, he opened a Kickstarter for a new game, American McGee's OZombie; however, due to slow/lackluster funding the project was canceled. Another Kickstarter for a project called Alice: Otherlands, a planned series of short films leading to a theatrical film, was announced a few days later. This reached its goal on August 4, 2013, and was officially confirmed.

Personal life

McGee has stated his mission is "to create a unified production method for story telling across the interactive and film industries" and of himself, he says, "I want to be the next Walt Disney, only a little more wicked."

In 2005, McGee left the United States and resided for a time in Hong Kong before moving to Shanghai, where he lived as of 2009. Once in China, he created Spicy Horse, at one point the largest independent Western game development house in the nation, and helped found Blade (formerly Vykarian), a game outsourcing company. They produced American McGee's Grimm for GameTap (now owned by Metaboli) and worked on the sequel to his original Alice game, Alice: Madness Returns.

He also mentions that his inspiration for the macabre tone of Alice comes from his disturbing, dysfunctional childhood.

McGee continues to live in Shanghai with his wife, Yeni Zhang. The couple co-founded Mysterious, Inc., a company that markets art, apparel, and accessories based on McGee's works. The couple have two children, Lucky Jack McGee (张吉克) and Leeloo McGee (张玲珑).

One of McGee's favorite books is Stephen King's On Writing: A Memoir of the Craft.

Games

Notes

References

External links

American McGee Reddit Questionnaire (January 21, 2013)
American McGee's Patreon page
Pirate Jam website

American atheists
American video game designers
Id Software people
Living people
1972 births
American expatriates in China